This is a list of Members of Parliament (MPs) elected in the 1874 general election.



References

See also
UK general election, 1874
List of parliaments of the United Kingdom

1874
 List
UK MPs
1874 United Kingdom general election